State Road 253 (NM 253) is a  state highway in the US state of New Mexico. NM 253's western terminus is at NM 256 southeast of Roswell, and the eastern terminus is at the end of route southeast of Roswell.

Major intersections

See also

References

253
Transportation in Chaves County, New Mexico